Sunday Lovers is a 1980 internationally co-produced romantic comedy film directed by Bryan Forbes, Gene Wilder, Dino Risi and Édouard Molinaro. It stars Roger Moore, Gene Wilder, Priscilla Barnes, Lynn Redgrave, Denholm Elliott and Kathleen Quinlan. It is split into four segments, each from a different country (Britain, France, the United States and Italy).

The film was released in Italy in October 1980 and in America in early 1981 by Metro-Goldwyn-Mayer and United Artists.

Cast
Roger Moore ...  Harry Lindon (segment "An Englishman's Home")
Lino Ventura ...  François Quérole (segment "The French Method")
Priscilla Barnes ...  Donna (segment "An Englishman's Home")
Gene Wilder ...  Skippy (segment "Skippy")
Lynn Redgrave ...  Lady Davina (segment "An Englishman's Home")
Kathleen Quinlan ...  Laurie (segment "Skippy")
Ugo Tognazzi ...  Armando (segment "Armando's Notebook")
Catherine Salviat ...  Christine (segment "The French Method")
Liù Bosisio ...  Anna (segment "Armando's Notebook")
Denholm Elliott ...  Parker (segment "An Englishman's Home")
Sylva Koscina ...  Zaira (segment "Armando's Notebook")
Beba Lončar ...  Marisa (segment "Armando's Notebook")
Rossana Podestà ...  Clara (segment "Armando's Notebook")
Milena Vukotic ...  Nora (segment "Armando's Notebook")
Robert Webber ...  Henry Morrison (segment "The French Method")
George Hillsden ...  (segment "An Englishman's Home")
Adelita Requena ...  (segment "The French Method")
Tommy Duggan ...  (segment "Skippy")
Pierre Douglas ...  Levègue (segment "The French Method")
Michèle Montel ...  Michèle Perrin (segment "The French Method")
Madeleine Barbulée ...  Mamie (segment "The French Method")
Gino Da Ronch ...  (segment "Armando's Notebook")
Lory Del Santo ...  (segment "Armando's Notebook") (as Loredana Del Santo)
Gianfilippo Carcano ...  (segment "Armando's Notebook")
Vittorio Zarfati ...  (segment "Armando's Notebook")
María Teresa Lombardo ...  (segment "Armando's Notebook")
Dianne Crittenden ...  Maggie (segment "Skippy")
Luis Ávalos ...  (segment "Skippy")
Randolph Dobbs ...  (segment "Skippy")
Catherine Spaak ...  Carletta, the psychoanalyst (segment "Armando's Notebook")
Francesco D'Adda ...  Husband of Woman Next Door (segment "Armando's Notebook") (uncredited)

References

External links
 
 
 

1980 films
1980 romantic comedy films
1980s English-language films
Films directed by Bryan Forbes
Films directed by Dino Risi
Films directed by Édouard Molinaro
Films directed by Gene Wilder
Films scored by Manuel De Sica
Films with screenplays by Age & Scarpelli
Films with screenplays by Gene Wilder
Metro-Goldwyn-Mayer films
British sex comedy films
British anthology films
American sex comedy films
American anthology films
French sex comedy films
French anthology films
Italian sex comedy films
Italian anthology films
1980s American films
1980s British films
1980s Italian films
1980s French films
Films with screenplays by Francis Veber